Philip Cofer (born June 19, 1996) is an American professional basketball player who is currently a free agent. He played college basketball for the Florida State Seminoles.

Early life and high school career
Cofer is the son of NFL linebacker Mike Cofer. Phil attended Whitewater High School. As a senior, he averaged 19.3 points, 12.8 rebounds and three blocked shots per game in 24 games. He had a season-high 35 point game. He signed with Florida State on May 19, 2014, after decommitting from Tennessee due to the departure of coach Cuonzo Martin. ESPN listed Cofer as the nation's No. 56 player in his class and assigned him a four-star rating.

College career
Cofer averaged 6.9 points and 4.5 rebounds per game as a freshman, making 24 starts. As a sophomore, he played in only 11 games due to a foot injury that shortened his season. When he came back as a junior, he still had not recovered from the lingering effects of the injury, and averaged 2.9 points per game. Cofer greatly improved his ballhandling, three-point shooting and scoring as a senior. “I’m not really sure I’ve had another player that I’ve coached that has made an improvement from one year to another,” coach Leonard Hamilton said. He had a career-high 28 points in a 100–93 loss to Duke on December 30, 2017. 

As a senior, Cofer led the Seminoles with 12.8 points per game, averaged 5.1 rebounds and played a team-high 29.3 minutes per game and was the only Florida State player to start all 35 games. He was an important piece of the Seminoles' run to the Elite Eight. On May 25, 2018, he was granted an extra year of eligibility by the NCAA due to his injury-shortened sophomore season. 

Cofer missed the first nine games of the 2018–19 season with a broken foot. He missed the NCAA Tournament opening round win over Vermont with a foot injury. After the game, he was informed that his father had died, and he missed the rest of the tournament to be with his family. He averaged 7.4 points and 3.5 rebounds per game as Florida State went 29–8 and reached the Sweet 16 in Cofer's redshirt senior season.

Professional career
Following the close of his college career, Cofer signed with the College Park Skyhawks of the NBA G League. He averaged 2.2 points and 2.3 rebounds per game in 23 games. He was waived by the Skyhawks on February 10, 2020. Cofer was acquired by the Long Island Nets, but was waived on February 23 after appearing in one game. On February 28, Cofer was acquired by the Memphis Hustle from the available player pool.

On March 4, 2021, Cofer signed with Telenet Giants Antwerp of the Belgian League. On December 4, 2021, Antwerp Giants announced it had reached an agreement with Cofer to terminate his contract.

Youtube Career 
Phil Cofer also has a youtube channel with over 150k subscribers. He creates general vlogs about his own life on that channel. His total views on the channel exceed 7 million and it was created on November 20th, 2011.

Career statistics

College

|-
| style="text-align:left;"| 2014–15
| style="text-align:left;"| Florida State
| 33 || 24 || 22.3 || .456 || .400 || .632 || 4.5 || .2 || .3 || .6 || 6.9
|-
| style="text-align:left;"| 2015–16
| style="text-align:left;"| Florida State
| 11 || 4 || 12.0 || .565 || .000 || .842 || 2.0 || .2 || .4 || .3 || 3.8
|-
| style="text-align:left;"| 2016–17
| style="text-align:left;"| Florida State
| 32 || 2 || 12.5 || .452 || .375 || .600 || 1.9 || .2 || .1 || .1 || 2.9
|-
| style="text-align:left;"| 2017–18
| style="text-align:left;"| Florida State
| 35 || 35 || 29.3 || .486 || .375 || .691 || 5.1 || .7 || .5 || .2 || 12.8
|-
| style="text-align:left;"| 2018–19
| style="text-align:left;"| Florida State
| 22 || 19 || 26.2 || .391 || .349 || .571 || 3.5 || .8 || .1 || .1 || 7.4
|- class="sortbottom"
| style="text-align:center;" colspan="2"| Career
| 133 || 84 || 21.6 || .459 || .366 || .662 || 3.7 || .4 || .3 || .3 || 7.3

References

External links
Florida State Seminoles bio

1996 births
Living people
American expatriate basketball people in Belgium
American men's basketball players
Antwerp Giants players
Basketball players from Georgia (U.S. state)
College Park Skyhawks players
Long Island Nets players
Memphis Hustle players
Florida State Seminoles men's basketball players
People from Fayetteville, Georgia
Power forwards (basketball)
Sportspeople from the Atlanta metropolitan area